The Homesick are a Dutch post-punk band from Dokkum, in the north of the Netherlands. The band is composed of drummer Erik Woudwijk, bassist Jaap van der Velde and guitarist Elias Elgersma.

They have released the albums Youth Hunt (Subroutine, 2017) and The Big Exercise (Sub Pop, 2020).

References

External links

Dutch post-punk music groups
Post-punk revival music groups